HMS Sardonyx was an  destroyer that served with the Royal Navy in the Second World War. Launched in 1919 soon after the armistice, the ship was commissioned into the Reserve Fleet. Later that year, the destroyer was sent to Latvia, arriving just after the cessation of that country's war of independence. The ship took part in radar trials in 1939, and was upgraded shortly after the start of the Second World War with greater anti-aircraft and anti-submarine capabilities. The destroyer then served as an escort, usually for convoys of merchant ships. The destroyer was also involved in escorting the landing parties for the Normandy landings in 1944. Soon afterwards, the ship was allocated to training. Sardonyx was retired and sold to be broken up in 1945.

Design and development

Sardonyx was one of thirty-three Admiralty  destroyers ordered by the British Admiralty during the First World War in June 1917 as part of the Twelfth War Construction Programme. Differences with the R class were minor, such as having the searchlight moved aft and mounting an additional pair of torpedo tubes.

Two funnels were fitted.

Armament consisted of three single QF  Mk IV guns on the ship's centreline.  One was mounted raised on the forecastle, one on a platform between the funnels and one aft. The ship also mounted a single 2-pounder  "pom-pom" anti-aircraft gun for air defence. Four  torpedo tubes were carried in two twin rotating mounts aft. Four depth charge chutes were also fitted aft. Typically ten depth charges were carried. The ship was designed to mount two additional  torpedo tubes either side of the superstructure but this required the forecastle plating to be cut away, making the vessel very wet, so they were removed. The weight saved enabled the heavier Mark V 21-inch torpedo to be carried. Fire control included a training-only director, single Dumaresq and a Vickers range clock. The ship had a complement of 90 officers and ratings.

Construction and career
Laid down on 25 March 1918 shortly before the end of the First World War by Alexander Stephen and Sons at their dockyard in Linthouse, Glasgow, Sardonyx was launched on 27 May the following year and completed on 12 July. The vessel was the first that served in the Royal Navy to bear the name of the semi-precious stone. Sardonyx was commissioned into the Reserve Fleet.

Interwar service
Although the war on the western front had finished with the signing of the Armistice, the escalating civil war in Russia continued and there was unrest in the Baltic Sea. This reached a peak when the people of Latvia declared independence which, after a war of independence, they achieved on 14 November. Sardonyx was one of the Royal Navy vessels sent to monitor the situation during the following month. The ship returned to the United Kingdom and was reduced to Reserve on 3 March 1920.

In November 1925, Sardonyx took part in search operations to find the missing submarine . M1 had been sunk with all hands in a collision on 12 November, but the submarine's wreck was not found until 1967. On 6 August 1931, Sardonyx was recommissioned at Portsmouth. On 27 January 1932, Sardonyx and sister ship  took part in the search for the missing submarine . M2 had sunk the day before. On 17 September 1935, as severe gales struck British waters, the steamer Brompton Manor sent out a distress signal while off the Owers lightvessel, near Selsey Bill. Sardonyx was ordered from Portsmouth to search for the steamer, which was successfully found later that day. Brompton Manors captain had been washed overboard by heavy seas, and the ships cargo shifted, giving a 30 degree list. Sardonyx stood by Brompton Manor until a tug could tow the steamer into Southampton. Sardonyx ran aground off Southsea on 31 January 1938, but was soon refloated, and sustained no damage. 

In 1939, trials were undertaken to detect the destroyer with radar. These were sufficiently successful for Sardonyx to be equipped with a  L band radar named the Combined Wireless Rangefinder and Lookout Set in June 1939.

Second World War
At the start of the Second World War, Sardonyx was part of the Local Defence Flotilla at Portsmouth. The destroyer was taken out of service and updated for the escort role. The midship and aft gun were removed and a high-angle QF 12-pounder anti-aircraft gun was fitted on a bandstand abaft the middle funnel. Two quadruple Vickers .50 machine guns were also mounted for close-in defence. The torpedo tubes were removed, the space allowing for additional depth charges, and two depth charge throwers were fitted alongside new racks aft. Initially 30 charges were now carried, although this increased as the war progressed. The destroyer reentered service but tragedy soon struck. On 31 May 1940, the destroyer struck and sank the trawler St Apollo off the Hebrides. Soon afterwards, in June, the Type 286M radar was fitted in Londonderry. The antenna proved too heavy for the mast and was lost in a gale, as was the replacement within two months. 

For the majority of the war, Sardonyx acted as a convoy escort. When Convoy HX 79 was attacked by the German submarine , which subsequently called a wolfpack of four other boats on 19 October 1940, Sardonyx was one of those sent to protect the convoy. Despite ten Royal Navy warships rushing to the scene, 12 ships in the convoy were sunk. This was the first success for the Wolfpacks. On 27 October, the destroyer was sent to escort the stricken liner , which had been attacked by Focke-Wulf Fw 200 Condor maritime patrol aircraft. Despite taking evasive manoeuvres, the liner was torpedoed and sunk by the German submarine . During the next five months, the destroyer was busy helping 16 convoys in the Atlantic Ocean, OB 236, HX 82, OB 239, HX 86, OB 245, HX 99, OB 256, SL/MKS 58, OB 262, HX 106, OB 269, SC 19, OB 278, SL/MKS 62, OB 283 and SC 69, rarely staying more than one or two days covering the western approaches.

The long term solution was to form Escort Groups with multiple warships. Sardonyx joined the 5th Escort Group which was formed in March 1941. On 15 March, the Group, led by Commander Donald Macintyre, joined Convoy HX 112 as an escort. The convoy had been travelling from Halifax, Nova Scotia, since 1 March. Despite losing six merchant ships, the Group successfully destroyed U-99 and U-100 although Sardonyx did not claim any hits. Subsequent operations were more successful. On 16 August, Sardonyx was part of the 8th Escort Group that formed the eastern ocean escort for convoy HX 143. On 4 October, the Group again safely accompanied ON(S) 23 safely across to rendezvous with escorts from the Royal Canadian Navy. On 1 November the Group escorted the 42 ships of ON 30 until being handed to destroyers from the US Navy. The role was reciprocated on 15 November when the Group received HX 160 from a US Navy escort. No merchant ship was lost in any of these operations. In all, the destroyer escorted 21 convoys during 1941.

The following year saw a similar pattern. Between 14 and 16 February, Sardonyx formed part of the 2nd Escort Group that accompanied Convoy ON 66 on the first stage of its journey. Once again, no ships were lost. The destroyer subsequently escorted five UR convoys travelling between Loch Ewe and Reykjavik, six RU convoys travelling back, WS 19W, WS 21S, WS 24, and MKS 3Y sailing from the south, and TA 21, AT 22, TA 22 and HX 206 crossing between Britain and North America.

During this time, the destroyer was upgraded again. The 12-pounder was removed and a Type 271 radar fitted instead while four single Oerlikon 20 mm cannon replaced the Vickers machine guns. Sardonyx reentered service, but the availability of dedicated escorts meant that the ship saw less use. Amongst the crew at the time was the future Admiral of the Fleet Henry Leach, who served as a midshipman before being promoted to sub-lieutenant on 1 October 1942. Another crew member was an American volunteer, Derek Lee, who served as a deck officer with the collateral job of security officer.

The start of 1943 saw a decrease in traffic. Between 21 and 23 January, Sardonyx, along with sister ship  took the merchant ship Leinster to Iceland, returning two days later. The same pattern repeated three more times over the next seven months. The last convoy of more than one merchant ship that Sardonyx supported was WS 30, which saw the destroyer for only the first two days of its journey to Freetown. On 8 June 1944, the destroyer escorted the troops that took part in the Normandy landings. Soon after, in October, the ship was withdrawn from operational service and allocated to training at Preston. On 23 June 1945, the ship was retired and handed over to be broken up by Thos. W. Ward at Inverkeithing.

Pennant numbers

References

Citations

Bibliography

 
 
 
 
 
 
 
 
 
 
 
 
 
 
 
 
 
 
 
 

1919 ships
Ships built on the River Clyde
S-class destroyers (1917) of the Royal Navy
World War II destroyers of the United Kingdom